Sir Frederick Hutchison Hervey-Bathurst, 3rd Baronet (6 June 1807 – 29 October 1881) was an English cricketer who played for Hampshire, MCC and the Gentlemen of England. He was a right-handed batsman who bowled right-arm roundarm fast.

Career 
Hervey-Bathurst made his first-class debut in 1831 for the Bs against an early England side.

He made his debut for the Marylebone Cricket Club against the Cambridge Town Club. Hervey-Bathurst would represent the MCC in 28 first-class matches up until 1855. In his 28 matches for the club, he scored 306 runs at a batting average of 7.46 and with a high score of 34. With the ball he took 63 wickets at a bowling average of 12.00, with best figures in an innings of 6/?.

In 1842, he made his debut for Hampshire against the Marylebone Cricket Club. Hervey-Bathurst represented Hampshire in 12 first-class matches between 1842 and 1861. In his 12 matches, he scored 203 runs at an average of 9.22 and a high score of 46. With the ball he took 72 wickets at an average of 14.23, with a best return of 7 wickets in an innings, although his exact best figures are unknown.

Hervey-Bathurst was one of three local gentlemen (alongside Thomas Chamberlayne and Sir John Barker-Mill) who financed the development of the Antelope Ground, Southampton, and installed the former Hampshire and Surrey cricketer Daniel Day in the Antelope Hotel.

As well as representing the above major sides, he also represented the Gentlemen in 20 Gentlemen v Players fixtures, where he took 73 wickets at an average of 11.25, with best figures of 7/?. He also represented the Gentlemen of England in 12 first-class matches, where he took 88 wickets at an average of 19.40, with a best return of 6 wickets in an innings. Hervey-Bathurst also represented A to K, England, the Gentlemen of Marylebone Cricket Club, the Gentlemen of the South, the South of England and the West of England.

In his overall first-class career he played 92 matches, scoring 817 runs at an average of 9.92, with a high score of 46. With the ball he took 349 wickets at an average of 13.02, with 32 five wicket hauls, 8 ten wicket hauls, and a best return of 7 wickets in an innings, although his exact figures are unknown.

Hervey-Bathurst died at Clarendon Park, Wiltshire on 19 October 1881.

Family
Hervey-Bathurst was the start of a cricketing family. He was the father of Frederick Hervey-Bathurst, 4th Baronet who represented both the MCC and the Hampshire team as well as Hampshire County Cricket Club. His other son, Lionel Hervey-Bathurst represented Hampshire in two first-class matches in 1875. His great-grandson Hervey Tudway played one first-class match for Somerset in 1910 and fought in the First World War; he was killed in action in 1914.

References

External links

1807 births
1881 deaths
People from the Isles of Scilly
English cricketers
Hampshire cricketers
Marylebone Cricket Club cricketers
Gentlemen cricketers
Baronets in the Baronetage of the United Kingdom
Gentlemen of the South cricketers
North v South cricketers
Left-Handed v Right-Handed cricketers
West of England cricketers
The Bs cricketers
Gentlemen of England cricketers
Gentlemen of Marylebone Cricket Club cricketers
Lord Strathavon's XI cricketers